Pierre Louvet (3 February 1617 – 1684, ?) was a 17th-century French historian, archivist and historiographer. He was one of the few seventeenth-century historians who worked as an archivist and the only one to specialize in local history.

Main publications 
1657: Remarques sur l'histoire du Languedoc, etc., Toulouse, in-4° ; reprinted under the title Abrégé de l'histoire du Languedoc et des princes qui y ont commandé, Nîmes, 1662, in-8°.
1659: Traité en forme d'abrégé de l'histoire d'Aquitaine, etc., Bordeaux 1659, in-4°
1662-1663: Inventaire du Grand Chartrier, Montpellier, 1 vol.
1674: La France dans sa splendeur, Lyon, 2 vol. in-12
1676: Abrégé de l'histoire de Provence, Aix en Provence, 2 vol. in-12
1679: Histoire des troubles de Provence, depuis son retour à la couronne (1481) jusqu'à la Peace of Vervins (1598), ibid., 2 vol. in-12.
1680: Additions et illustrations sur l'histoire de Provence, ibid., 2 vol. in-12
1672: Histoire de Villefranche, capitale du Beaujolais, Lyon, in-8°.
1673–1680: Le Mercure hollandais, ou Conquete du roi en Hollande, en Franche-Comté, en Allemagne et en Catalogne, depuis l'an 1672 jusqu'à la fin de 1672, Lyon, 10 vol. in-12.

Sources

Bibliography 
 (This thesis, which is a contribution to the social history of intellectual work, tries to capture the course of Pierre Louvet (1617-1684), a now forgotten historian, who was even, frankly, held negligible in his lifetime, but his career, quite singular, makes a point of interest. Starting from the very bottom of the social ladder, P. Louvet managed somehow to live from history and this, without ever having been clerk or even a servant of a "Great", if fleetingly; instead he applied systematically to local communities in the South of France, offering them his archivist services or offering them, with varying success, his works, mostly local stories, which for much of these were in the form of abstracts of which he partly took his part of the printing costs).

References

External links 
Illustres Inconnus : Pierre Louvet (1617-1684), un historien atypique sur sisteronrevue.blogspot.fr

17th-century French historians
French archivists
French historiographers
People from Beauvais
1617 births
1684 deaths